Marc Lais (born 4 February 1991) is a German former professional footballer who played as a midfielder.

References 

Living people
1991 births
German footballers
Association football midfielders
SC Freiburg players
SV Sandhausen players
Chemnitzer FC players
SSV Jahn Regensburg players
SV Wehen Wiesbaden
Bundesliga players
2. Bundesliga players
3. Liga players
Regionalliga players
Sportspeople from Freiburg im Breisgau
Footballers from Baden-Württemberg